Phlegmariurus columnaris is a species of plant in the family Lycopodiaceae. It is endemic to Ecuador.

Its natural habitats are subtropical or tropical moist montane forest and subtropical or tropical high-altitude grassland. It is threatened by habitat loss.

References

columnaris
Endemic flora of Ecuador
Vulnerable plants
Taxonomy articles created by Polbot
Taxobox binomials not recognized by IUCN